East Looe was a parliamentary borough represented in the House of Commons of England from 1571 to 1707, in the House of Commons of Great Britain from 1797 to 1800, and finally in the House of Commons of the United Kingdom from 1801 until its abolition in 1832. It elected two Members of Parliament (MP) by the bloc vote system of election. It was disenfranchised in the Reform Act 1832.

History
The borough consisted of the town of East Looe in Cornwall, connected by bridge across the River Looe to West Looe, which was also a parliamentary borough. From the reign of Edward VI, East Looe and West Looe were jointly a borough, returning two members of Parliament; however, under Queen Elizabeth the two towns were separated, and each thereafter returned two members except between 1654 and 1658, when they were once again represented jointly as East Looe and West Looe, by one member of the First and Second Protectorate Parliaments.

The right of election was in Mayor and members of the corporation, together with a number of freemen of the borough.  Namier and Brooke estimated that there were about fifty voters in this constituency in the second half of the eighteenth century. It is estimated that by 1800 there were still about fifty electors, and in 1831 the number of eligible voters was 38 while the population of the borough was 865.

In practice, this meant that the power to choose the MPs was in the hands of the local landowner or "proprietor", making East Looe (like West Looe) one of the most notorious of the rotten boroughs. The borough was long controlled by the Trelawny family of the nearby manor of Trelawny in the parish of Pelynt. For many years at the time of the Reform Act, East Looe had been controlled  by the Buller family of Morval (which also controlled West Looe and Saltash), and many members of the family sat for the borough in the House of Commons.

After the Reform Act 1832 disenfranchised the borough, it reverted to being represented as part of the county constituency covering its area. Cornwall was divided into two divisions in 1832, East Cornwall (with its place of election at Bodmin) and West Cornwall (which voted at Truro). East Looe was located in East Cornwall.

Members of Parliament

1571-1629

1640-1832

See also

 West Looe (UK Parliament constituency)
 MPs elected in the British general election, 1754
 Unreformed House of Commons

Notes

References
 Robert Beatson, A Chronological Register of Both Houses of Parliament (London: Longman, Hurst, Res & Orme, 1807)
 D Brunton & D H Pennington, Members of the Long Parliament (London: George Allen & Unwin, 1954)
 William Cobbett, Cobbett's Parliamentary history of England, from the Norman Conquest in 1066 to the year 1803 (London: Thomas Hansard, 1808) 
 Lewis Namier and John Brooke, The House of Commons 1754-1790 (LOndon: HMSO, 1964)
 J Holladay Philbin, Parliamentary Representation 1832 - England and Wales (New Haven: Yale University Press, 1965)
 Henry Stooks Smith, The Parliaments of England from 1715 to 1847 (2nd edition, edited by FWS Craig - Chichester: Parliamentary Reference Publications, 1973)
 

Parliamentary constituencies in Cornwall (historic)
Rotten boroughs
Constituencies of the Parliament of the United Kingdom established in 1571
Constituencies of the Parliament of the United Kingdom disestablished in 1832
Looe